Otto Dresel (December 20, 1826 – July 26, 1890) was an American pianist, music teacher and composer of German birth.

Biography
He studied with Moritz Hauptmann in Leipzig, and received guidance
from Ferdinand Hiller and Felix Mendelssohn. Between 1846 and 1848 he wrote two chamber works, a piano trio and a piano quartet. He came to the United States in 1848. His participation in the revolutions of 1848 in Germany were a factor in this decision. And after 1848, faster and safer steamers encouraged European musicians, especially those from Germany, to come to the United States to teach and perform. In New York City, Dresel joined Theodore Eisfeld in presenting concerts.

In 1852 he moved to Boston, Massachusetts, where he lived until his death in Beverly, Massachusetts. He married Anna Loring (1830–1896), daughter of Ellis Gray Loring, an abolitionist and a founder of the New England Anti-Slavery Society, on October 29, 1863. They had two children, Louisa Loring Dresel (1864–195-) and Ellis Loring Dresel (1865–1925), an attorney and diplomat.

He was well known as a pianist in Boston. He composed mainly chamber music and songs, as well as larger-scale settings of poems by Henry Wadsworth Longfellow and Oliver Wendell Holmes for soloists with orchestra.

Dresel concentrated his energies on the selecting the highest quality music for his performances, and he eschewed displays of facile brilliance as were emphasized by musicians such as Europeans like Henri Herz and Sigismond Thalberg and the American Louis Moreau Gottschalk. He fostered the appreciation of Bach and Handel in the United States, and was a vigorous promoter of the songs of his friend and colleague Robert Franz.

Compositions
 David Francis Urrows, Otto Dresel: Collected Vocal Music (Middleton, WI: A-R Editions, 2002)
 David Francis Urrows, Otto Dresel: Chamber Works (Middleton, WI: A-R Editions, 2009)
Piano Trio in A Minor
Piano Quartet in F Major

Notes

References

Additional sources
 William F. Apthorp, "Two Modern Classicists in Music" Part I, The Atlantic, vol. 72, October 1893, pp. 488–503. [Dresel and Franz]
 William F. Apthorp, "Two Modern Classicists in Music" Part II, The Atlantic, vol. 72, November 1893, pp. 638–49. [Dresel and Franz]
 John Tasker Howard, Our American Music: Three Hundred Years of It (NY: Thomas Y. Crowell Company, 1939)
 David Francis Urrows. "Apollo in Athens: Otto Dresel and Boston, 1850-90," American Music, Vol. 12, No. 4 (Winter, 1994), pp. 345–388

1826 births
1890 deaths
American male composers
German-American Forty-Eighters
Musicians from Boston
19th century in Boston
19th-century American pianists
19th-century American composers
19th-century American male musicians
American male pianists